Home Is Where You Hang Yourself is an album by Her Space Holiday. It was released in 2000 on Tiger Style Records in the United States, and Wichita Recordings in the UK. The album was re-released on a single CD as Home Is Where You Hang Yourself 2.0, in 2002.

Critical reception
Phoenix New Times wrote that "the collection of low-bpm originals on Home Is Where You Hang Yourself is a masterful merging of oscillating synths, barely audible samples and sporadic breaks complementing the morose imagery."

Disc 1
 "Home Is Where You Hang Yourself"
 "Snakecharmer"
 "Through the Eyes of a Child"
 "A Matter of Trust"
 "The Doctor and the DJ"
 "Sleeping Pills"
 "Famous to Me"
 "Can You Blame Me?"
 "Sugar Water"
 "Homecoming"

Disc 2
 "Misery Loves Company" (Space is Easy Mix)
 "Godspeed" (Freedom Fighter's Mix) - Aspera Ad Astra
 "Contrast and Compare" (Making Words Mix) - Bright Eyes
 "Sounds Just Like an Ocean" (Ocean Floored Mix) - Novasonic Down Hypserspace
 "Smile Decoy" (To Mars and Back Mix) - Micromars
 "Singing Arc Lamp" (Natural Satellites Mix) - Mahogany
 "And Things Are Mostly Ghosts" (Version Overdose Mix) - Duster
 "Famous to Me" (Hurtful Kid Mix)

Home Is Where You Hang Yourself 2.0 
The album was re-released in 2002 on one disc.
 "Home Is Where You Hang Yourself"
 "Snakecharmer"
 "Through the Eyes of a Child"
 "A Matter of Trust"
 "The Doctor and the DJ"
 "Sleeping Pills"
 "Famous to Me"
 "Our First Date"
 "Can You Blame Me?"
 "Sugar Water"
 "Contrast and Compare" (Making Words Mix) - Bright Eyes
 "Godspeed" (Freedom Fighter's Mix) - Aspera Ad Astra
 "And Things Are Mostly Ghosts" (Version Overdose Mix) - Duster
 "Singing Arc Lamp" (Natural Satellites Mix) - Mahogany
 "Misery Loves Company" (Space is Easy Mix)
 "Famous to Me" (Hurtful Kid Mix)

References

2000 albums
2002 albums
Her Space Holiday albums
Wichita Recordings albums